Eden Hills  is a south eastern suburb located in the foothills of Adelaide, South Australia. It is part of the local government area of the City of Mitcham.

History
Whilst the derivation of the name is not conclusive, the Department of Lands Grant Book reveals the first land owner in the area was William Detmar Cook who purchased a property on 29 October 1839. Cook was Master of the barque Eden.

There was little settlement of the area until the early 1880s, when the railway from Adelaide to Nairne opened, being the first stage in the plan to link Adelaide to Melbourne. In 1883, a syndicate comprising John Whyte, James Cowan, Ebenezer Ward, John Hill, R. D. Moore, Seth Ferry and G. H. Catchlove acquired the sections of land where the suburb is now centred, and following a survey laid out the land into allotments.

Around that time Edwin Ashby moved into the area.  Ashby and fellow land agent and financier Ernest Saunders owned and largely developed much of Eden Hills from 1890 and Ashby established the property Wittunga (now the Wittunga Botanic Garden) in Blackwood.

The opening of the Eden Hills railway station in 1911 hastened development in the area.  A post office and store opened in 1912 and a school (now Eden Hills Primary School) opened in 1916. The school's original stone classroom survives as a reception area. The Ashby family instigated the building of a Friends meeting house in 1912 which served as a venue for several religious denominations, the local dramatic society and other community events.  It was demolished in 1956. An Anglican Parish Hall was built in 1927, and a Methodist church established in 1937, moving to its current location (now Eden Hills Uniting Church) in 1957.

A brickworks was established near the railway line and (originally Shephard's) Shepherds Hill Road in 1881 to facilitate the building of railway tunnels and remained in operation until 1933.  A smaller brickyard operated near Parham Road from 1884 to 1930. Nearby in Wade Road is Seaview, the oldest known residence in Eden Hills, built in 1849.

Places of interest

Blackwood High School, 1st Eden Hills Scout Group Blackwood Primary School and Eden Hills Primary School are located in Eden Hills. Eden Hills railway station is on the Belair railway line. Eden Hills also has a Country Fire Service Station, established in 1951.

Eden Hills Scout Group
A part of Scouts SA, and the World Scouting Movement. It has been providing opportunities for youth in the local community to experience the outdoors and undergo leadership development. It has had a significant impact on the local community through service projects such as cleaning up the land by Eden Hills Station, fundraising for the droughts and teaching youth to be global citizens.

Watiparinga Reserve
Watiparinga Reserve and adjacent land near Gloucester Avenue in Eden Hills was added to the Register of the National Estate in 1996. The Reserve also contains remnants of the original 1880s Adelaide to Melbourne railway line, including an original single-track tunnel and concrete viaduct buttresses. The Reserve contains the first National Trust of South Australia plaque to be erected, which was unveiled in 1959.
 
Watiparinga Reserve was developed as farmland in 1850–51. The South Australian Railways bought some of the land for the single-track railway line and viaduct in 1880. In 1911, the farmland was acquired by Ernest Saunders and Edwin Ashby. During World War II, the former railway tunnel in the reserve was used for safe storage of South Australian art treasures and is now used to grow mushrooms commercially. The property was transferred to Ashby in 1922 and farmed as part of his Wittunga property. In the late 1950s, daughter Alison Marjorie Ashby began planting thousands of seedlings of Australian plants in Watiparinga. She eventually donated Watiparinga to the National Trust of South Australia in 1957.

Wittunga Botanic Garden

The Wittunga Botanic Garden, in the southeastern corner of the suburb and extending east into Blackwood, was also part of Edwin Ashby's Wittunga property. Originally a formal English garden at Ashby's home, his son Arthur Keith Ashby later included South African and native Australian plants. The garden was donated to the State in 1965, and is now administered as one of the three Botanic Gardens in Adelaide, the others being the Adelaide Botanic Garden and the Mount Lofty Botanic Garden.

Colebrook Reconciliation Park
Colebrook Reconciliation Park in Eden Hills was established from 1998 as a memorial to the children who were removed from their families and housed at Colebrook Home, a "United Aborigines" mission which had originated in Oodnadatta in 1924, moved to Quorn, then finally relocated to Eden Hills in 1942. At its Eden Hills location, Colebrook Home continued to house children, including prominent Aboriginal Australian health worker and public administrator Lowitja O'Donoghue. By 1956 the property was in poor condition and the home was finally closed in 1972 and demolished in 1973.

The Reconciliation Park was born out of meetings in the 1990s between a local reconciliation study group and the Tji Tji Tjuta (former residents) of Colebrook Home.  This led to memorial works including Fountain of Tears, created in 1998 by Silvio Apponyi and Grieving Mother in 1999.

Notes

Suburbs of Adelaide